The 2000 Year Old Man is a comedy sketch, created by Carl Reiner and Mel Brooks in the 1950s and first publicly performed in the 1960s. Brooks plays a 2000-year-old man, interviewed by Reiner in a series of comedy routines that were turned into a collection of records and also performed on television.

History
The foundation for the routine was laid during production of Your Show of Shows, where Reiner was an actor and Brooks was a writer. Reiner describes the first instance:

It began as a joke between the two that was then shared at parties. Reiner started bringing a tape recorder to the parties as Brooks never said the same thing twice. Numerous people such as George Burns suggested to the two that they put their material on an album, but only Steve Allen managed to coax the two to come record it in his studio. Reiner recalls the moment he and Brooks realized the first album was going to be a hit:

Sketch
Reiner was the straight man, asking interview questions of Brooks, who would improvise answers in a Jewish-American accent. The free-wheeling semi-improvised sketches covered a wide variety of topics from marriage ("I have been married several hundred times") and children ("I have over 42,000 children and not one comes to visit me!") to transportation ("What was the means of transportation then? Mostly fear.").

The quality of the sketch was elevated by the quick improvisational wit of Brooks, who would usually use a question as a springboard to unplanned exposition and tangents that would be as much of a surprise to his partner as it was to the audience. Reiner continued to act as the voice of the audience, providing questions and challenging Brooks' answers. "He was like a district attorney" claims Brooks. Reiner's knowledge of history and momentous events raised the bar on the exchanges. "I knew the questions" quipped Reiner, "but I didn't know the answers." While Reiner deferred the great lines to Brooks, he knew his friend well enough to follow along and cross paths enough to prop him up for more opportunities.

Recordings and performances
Their first television appearances performing the sketch were on The Ed Sullivan Show in February 1961 and then on The Steve Allen Show eight months later.

Reiner and Brooks released five comedy albums. The 2000 Year Old Man character appeared on one track for each of the first three albums and the entirety of the final two.

 2000 Years with Carl Reiner and Mel Brooks (1960)
 2000 and One Years with Carl Reiner and Mel Brooks (1961)
 Carl Reiner and Mel Brooks at the Cannes Film Festival (1962)
 2000 and Thirteen with Carl Reiner and Mel Brooks (Warner Bros. Records, 1973)
 The 2000 Year Old Man in the Year 2000 (1997)

The 2000 Year Old Man in the Year 2000 was released concurrently with a companion book of the same name. It also won the 1998 Grammy Award for Best Spoken Comedy Album.

There have also been numerous compilation albums such as Best of the 2000 Year Old Man (1968) and Excerpts from The Complete 2000 Year Old Man (Rhino Records, 1994).

Animated special

A half-hour animated television special, The 2000 Year Old Man, premiered January 11, 1975. The dialogue for the special was taken from the live recordings of Reiner and Brooks. This special has since been released on home video. The musical introduction was Bach's Sinfonia to Cantata #29 performed on a Moog synthesizer by Mort Garson.

Most of the jokes were previously heard routines and/or eventually brought to the screen in Brooks' film History of the World, Part I (especially the caveman jokes).

Legacy

Home media
All five comedy albums were compiled and newly remastered on a 3-CD / 1-DVD box set by Shout! Factory for the 50th anniversary. The 2000 Year Old Man: The Complete History DVD was released November 24, 2009, and features an interview with Reiner and Brooks; the 1975 animated 2000 Year Old Man television special, and clips of the two appearing on The Ed Sullivan Show and The New Steve Allen Show.

The album 2000 Years With Carl Reiner and Mel Brooks was added to the Library of Congress' National Recording Registry as part of its 2008 selections.

Appearances in other media
Mel Brooks appeared as the 2000 Year Old Man to help celebrate the 2000th episode of the original Jeopardy! hosted by Art Fleming (February 21, 1972), in which the three highest-scoring undefeated champions at that point returned to play an abbreviated game for charities. During his pre-game appearance he recounted how the show was done 2,000 years earlier—"It wasn't this hippy-happy-dappy game you've got here … the moment you walked out of your cave—Jeopardy!" On the March 17, 2014 airing of the current Jeopardy! hosted by Alex Trebek, Reiner and Brooks read an entire category of clues as their characters.

Brooks adapted the character to create the 2500 Year Old Brewmaster for Ballantine Beer in the 1960s. Interviewed by Dick Cavett in a series of ads, the Brewmaster (in a German accent, as opposed to the 2000 Year Old Man's Jewish voice) said he was inside the original Trojan horse and "could've used a six-pack of fresh air."

In the episode of The Simpsons entitled "Homer vs. Patty and Selma", Brooks appears as himself, riding in a limo being driven by Homer. After Homer incorrectly identifies the act as "The 2000-pound man thing," he and Brooks engage in a brief sketch, with Homer playing the part of Carl Reiner. When Homer is pulled over by the police, Chief Wiggum offers to give Brooks a ride and says they can do "the $2000-Man thing." Brooks agrees, but asks that he not play Reiner's part—"I hate Carl Reiner!", he says.

In an episode of Studio 60 on the Sunset Strip entitled "The Option Period", comedy writer Rick Tahoe uses The 2000 Year Old Man as an example of an ideal comedy sketch.

References

External links 
  (2000 Year Old Man)
 
 
 

Fictional characters introduced in 1960
1961 in radio
1961 in American television
Comedy radio characters
Comedy theatre characters
Male characters in theatre
Male characters in radio
Theatre characters introduced in 1961
Radio characters introduced in 1961
Comedy sketches
Works by Mel Brooks
Works by Carl Reiner
Works about old age
1960s in comedy